Nicostratos the Pelican is a 2011 French comedy film directed by Olivier Horlait.

Cast 
 Emir Kusturica as Démosthène
 Thibault Le Guellec as Yannis
 François-Xavier Demaison as Aristote
 Jade-Rose Parker as Angeliki
 Gennadios Patsis as Popa Kosmas
  as Mme Karoussos

References

External links 

2011 comedy films
2011 films
French comedy films
2010s French films